Hillington is a village and civil parish in the English county of Norfolk.
For the purposes of local government, it falls within the district of King's Lynn and West Norfolk.

The village straddles the A148 King's Lynn to Cromer road. It formerly had a railway station, but this closed in 1959.

History

The settlement was recorded in the Domesday Book as Helingetuna, which is believed to mean ‘the farmstead of the family or followers of a man named Hythla or Hydl'.

Archaeological test pits were dug between 2015–2017 and a report was published in 2019.

Notable people
Hillington is the traditional home of the ffolkes baronets. Francis ffolkes, 5th Baronet was Rector of Hillington from 1912 until his death. His nephew, the intelligence officer and conservationist Tracy Philipps, was born here in 1888.

Notes

External links

 
Villages in Norfolk
Civil parishes in Norfolk
King's Lynn and West Norfolk